Hösle, Hoesle or Hosle may refer to:

Vittorio Hösle, German philosopher
Robert Hoesle, partner of Behnisch Architekten
Hosle,  district in the municipality of Bærum, Norway
Hosle IL, sports club